The European Grand Prix (also known as the Grand Prix of Europe) was a Formula One event that was introduced during the mid-1980s and was held every year from  to , except in . During these years, the European Grand Prix was held in a country that hosted its own national Grand Prix at a different point in the same season, at a different circuit (except in ).

In earlier years, the European Grand Prix was not a race in its own right, but an honorific title given to one of the national Grands Prix in Europe. The first race to be so named was the 1923 Italian Grand Prix, held at Monza, and the last was the 1977 British Grand Prix at Silverstone.

As an honorific title
The European Grand Prix was created as an honorific title by the AIACR, the FIA's predecessor in the organisation of motor racing events. The first race to receive the title was the Italian Grand Prix, in 1923; the French Grand Prix followed in 1924 and the Belgian Grand Prix in 1925. After a hiatus in 1929, the Belgian race received the title in 1930, becoming the last race to do so before World War II.

The title was revived by the FIA after the war, when it was given to the 1947 Belgian Grand Prix. For the next thirty years (except 1953 and 1969–71), the title was distributed across several countries, including at the prestigious Monaco Grand Prix in 1963. The last race to receive the title was the 1977 British Grand Prix. All post-war honorific European Grands Prix were Formula One races except for the 1952 event, the Belgian Grand Prix, which was run to Formula Two regulations.

The Italian and Belgian Grands Prix both received the title seven times, more than any other race.

As a round of the World Championship

Brands Hatch
The event was initially created as a stop-gap. In 1983, the Formula One schedule originally featured a race near Flushing Meadows in New York City. When the race was cancelled three months before the event, track organizers at Brands Hatch were able to create a European Grand Prix at the track in its place. The success of the event, buoyed by a spirited battle for the World Championship, led to the event returning on the schedule the following year.

Brands Hatch was unable to host the European Grand Prix in 1984, as it was hosting the British Grand Prix in even numbered years (alternating with Silverstone) so the European GP went to a redesigned and shorter Nürburgring circuit in 1984.

Brands Hatch returned to host the European Grand Prix in 1985, but the race was replaced in 1986 by the Hungarian Grand Prix. Originally the 1985 European Grand Prix was going to be held in Rome on a street circuit around the EUR but was moved to Brands Hatch.

Donington Park
In 1990, a wealthy Japanese businessman, Tomonori Tsurumaki, built the Nippon Autopolis with the idea of hosting a Formula One race. In 1992, plans were made to have an Asian Grand Prix in 1993 to replace the Mexican Grand Prix on the schedule. However, these plans failed to materialise. Instead, Bernie Ecclestone added a race at Donington Park to the schedule, which brought back the European Grand Prix moniker. The race was the brainchild of Tom Wheatcroft, who had been trying to bring F1 to the track since an abortive attempt to host the British Grand Prix in 1988. The first and so far only Formula One Grand Prix at Donington Park resulted in Ayrton Senna's victory in mixed wet and dry conditions.

Jerez
The European race would go the following season to Jerez in Spain. Jerez hosted round 14 of 16 in 1994 and the season finale in 1997, and it was the site of the famous collision between Michael Schumacher and Jacques Villeneuve which saw Schumacher get disqualified from the championship and it was also the scene of Mika Häkkinen's first Formula One victory.

Nürburgring
Brands Hatch was unable to host the European Grand Prix in 1984, so the European GP went to a redesigned and shorter Nürburgring circuit in 1984. It was a far cry from the 23 kilometre Nürburgring that most were used to seeing, and was initially unpopular during Formula One's return.

The race returned to Nürburgring in 1995, which was now popular again with drivers. But after complaints that no other countries were to get the race, the Nürburgring race was renamed the Luxembourg Grand Prix. Jerez got the race back in 1997 as a replacement for the Portuguese Grand Prix.

In 1998, the European Grand Prix was dropped from the schedule, but returned in 1999 when the race at Nürburgring re-adopted the European Grand Prix name.

The 1999 race saw torrential rain conditions which caused numerous retirements, presenting Johnny Herbert with the opportunity to take Stewart Grand Prix's first and only victory in its final season before being sold to Ford.

The race continued to be held at the Nürburgring until 2007. On 29 August 2006 it was announced that it had been removed from the F1 calendar for the 2007 season. From then there would only be one GP hosted in Germany each year, alternating between Hockenheimring and Nürburgring. However, what the name of this Grand Prix would be was uncertain for a time; while originally intended to be the German Grand Prix from 2007, the Nürburgring race of 2007 was renamed "Großer Preis von Europa" (European Grand Prix) due to a dispute over the ownership of the title "German Grand Prix".

Valencia
From  to  the European Grand Prix took place in Valencia, Spain. During the 2009 event, Valencia signed a deal for a further 5 races, which put Valencia on the calendar until 2014. Despite this, in March 2012, it was announced that the European Grand Prix was to be discontinued in 2013, with the Spanish Grand Prix planned to alternate between Barcelona and Valencia. However, Barcelona has retained the race since 2013, and the Valencia circuit was removed from the calendar.

Baku

The race was renamed the Azerbaijan Grand Prix for the  season. This means that the European Grand Prix was again discontinued after a one-off in 2016.

Winners of the European Grand Prix

Repeat winners (drivers)
Only includes standalone events.

Drivers in bold are competing in the Formula One championship in the current season.

Repeat winners (constructors)
Only includes standalone events.

Teams in bold are competing in the Formula One championship in the current season.

Repeat winners (engine manufacturers)
Only includes standalone events.

Manufacturers in bold are competing in the Formula One championship in the current season.

* Built by Ilmor in 1997

** Built by Cosworth

By year: the European Grand Prix as a standalone event

By year: the European Grand Prix as an honorary designation
A pink background indicates an event which was not part of the Formula One World Championship.

References

External links

 Formula 1 European Grand Prix in Valencia Official website.
 Nürburgring F1 statistics

 
Formula One Grands Prix
Recurring sporting events established in 1923
Recurring sporting events established in 1983
Recurring sporting events disestablished in 2016